Kerril Wade (born June 1986) is an Irish hurler who plays for Galway Senior Championship club Sarsfields. He is a former member of the Galway senior hurling team, having lined out as a corner-forward.

Career

Wade first came to prominence on the inter-county scene as a member of the Galway minor team that beat Kilkenny to win the 2004 All-Ireland Minor Championship. He was immediately drafted onto the Galway under-21 team and won two All-Ireland Under-21 Championship titles in three seasons between 2005 and 2007. He subsequently joined the Galway senior hurling team and made a number of appearances but ultimately ended his senior career without silverware. Wade played his club hurling with Sarsfields and won a County Championship title in 2015.

Honours

Sarsfields
Galway Senior Hurling Championship: 2015
All-Ireland Junior B Club Hurling Championship: 2023
Leinster Junior B Club Hurling Championship: 2023

Galway
All-Ireland Under-21 Hurling Championship: 2005, 2007
All-Ireland Minor Hurling Championship: 2004

References

1986 births
Living people
Sarsfields (Galway) hurlers
Galway inter-county hurlers